Ematheudes persicella is a species of snout moth in the genus Ematheudes. It was described by Hans Georg Amsel in 1961 and is known from Iran.

References

Moths described in 1961
Anerastiini